Jody Peter "J.P." Weis is the former Superintendent of Police of the Chicago Police Department.  Weis was selected to serve as the 54th Superintendent of Police by Mayor Richard M. Daley. Upon his resignation and retirement, he was replaced by Interim Superintendent Terry Hillard, a predecessor. He was permanently replaced by Mayor Rahm Emanuel, who named Garry McCarthy to the post. Superintendent Weis, when he became Superintendent, had replaced former Superintendent of Police Philip J. Cline after his resignation.  Superintendent Weis took office on February 1, 2008.

Weis's previous experience included 22 years in the Federal Bureau of Investigation. Weis graduated from the University of Tampa in 1979.

On March 17, 2009, a few months after the Chicago lodge of the Fraternal Order of Police announced that they would be funding the defense of Cmdr. Jon Burge, the lodge produced a vote of no-confidence in Weis.

A 2012 audit by the Chicago Inspector General determined that the Chicago Police Department had under-counted aggravated assault and aggravated battery victims by 25 percent by not following state guidelines by counting each incident rather than each victim. Police Superintendent Garry McCarthy attributed the error to the administration of his predecessor, Jody Weis.

References

External links
Federal Bureau of Investigation Press Release on Appointing Jody Weis SAC in Philadelphia
Daley Reaches Outside City for New Top Cop
Department Webpage

Living people
People from Chicago
Superintendents of the Chicago Police Department
University of Tampa alumni
Federal Bureau of Investigation agents
1957 births